Geoffrey Meye (born 12 December 1982) is a Dutch former professional footballer who played on the professional level for Dutch club FC Den Bosch of the Eredivisie league during the 2001–02 season.

References

1982 births
Living people
Dutch footballers
Footballers from Utrecht (city)
Association football defenders
FC Den Bosch players
Eredivisie players